Dorcadion balthasari is a species of beetle in the family Cerambycidae. It was described by Heyrovský in 1962. It is known from Albania.

See also 
Dorcadion

References

balthasari
Beetles described in 1962